Kwat Lat Ma Shi is a Burmese drama television series. It is an adaptation of the novel "Ta Khu Lat Pay Mae Kwat Lat Ma Shi" by Le Dwin Thar Saw Chit. It aired on MRTV-4, from December 22, 2022 to February 2, 2023, on Mondays to Fridays at 19:00 for 31 episodes.

Synopsis
Moe Moe Aye had to marry Nay Min Ta Yar because of her mother's wish. After his mother died, he went to his mother-in-law's house. In the beginning, Moe Moe Aye was comfortable and happy, but later on, she suffered from her mother-in-law's cunning.  Her mother-in-law also sold the house where she lived with his mother. Her mother-in-law did not give her the money that could be sold.  Moe Moe Aye had to stop her mother-in-law from selling another house. Later she became pregnant. Her mother-in-law did not take care of the pregnant of her. After she gave birth, her husband became very addicted to drugs. Later, she couldn't bear it anymore, so she asked for a divorce, called her son, and came down from her mother-in-law's house. She was still free and lived in her house with her son. Moe Moe Aye met Ko Myat Htun, the owner of the company who loved and cared for her son. Her son loved Ko Myat Htun, and she also loved him, so they got married. Finally, they lived with happiness with their family.

Cast
Poe Kyar Phyu Khin as Moe Moe Aye
Kyaw Htet Zaw as Ko Myat Htun
Khine Hnin Wai as Daw Tin Tin Maw
Shin Mway La as Nay Min Ta Yar
Nay Lin Shein as Ye Min Htet
A Lin Thit as Sai Lu
Wyne Shwe Yi as Tin Nwe Latt
Phyo Khant (child cast) as Nyein Chan Aye

References

Burmese television series
MRTV (TV network) original programming